The 2002–03 season is the seventh in the history of the Glasgow Warriors as a professional side. During this season the young professional side competed as Glasgow Rugby.

The 2002–03 season saw Glasgow Rugby compete in the competitions: the Celtic League and the European Champions Cup, the Heineken Cup and a reformed Scottish Inter-District Championship, for sponsorship reasons known as the Bank of Scotland Pro Cup.

Season Overview

Report
Report
Report

Team

Coaches

Head coach:  Kiwi Searancke to April 2003;  Hugh Campbell from April 2003
Assistant coach:  Gordon Macpherson to April 2003;   Shade Munro from April 2003
Assistant coach:  Steve Anderson to April 2003;   Sean Lineen from April 2003

Squad

Academy players

There are no Academy players for Glasgow Warriors in the 2002–03 season however these players were used in Glasgow's Development XV team.

Gordon Macfadyen (Glasgow Hawks)
Justin Reid (Glasgow Hutchesons Aloysians)
Paul Burke (Ayr)
Stephen MacKinnon (Glasgow Hutchesons Aloysians)
Gavin Mories (Glasgow Hawks)
Stuart Male (Glasgow Hawks)
Colin Shaw (Glasgow Hawks)
Graham Thomson (West of Scotland)
Sam Parlane (Stirling County)
Euan Murray (Glasgow Hawks)
Neil Meikle (Ayr)
Damien Kelly (Ayr)
Scott McKechnie (Grangemouth Stags)
Colin Eadie (Stirling County)
Eddie Manawaiti (Ayr)
Richard Maxton (Glasgow Hawks)
Alastair Davidson (Borders)
Stephen MacKinnon (Glasgow Hutchesons Aloysians)

Player statistics

During the 2002–03 season, Glasgow have used 32 different players in competitive games. The table below shows the number of appearances and points scored by each player.

Staff movements

Coaches

Personnel In

 Kiwi Searancke from  Waikato Rugby Union
 Steve Anderson from  Warrington Wolves Rugby League F.C.
 Hugh Campbell from  Scotland A
 Sean Lineen from  Boroughmuir RFC
 Shade Munro from  Glasgow Hawks

Personnel Out

 Richie Dixon  to  Scottish Rugby Union Head of Coach Development
 Rob Moffat to  Border Reivers
 Kiwi Searancke released
 Steve Anderson to  Scottish Rugby Union High Performance Manager
 Gordon Macpherson to  West of Scotland

Player movements

Academy promotions

Player transfers

In

 Ben Daly from  New South Wales Waratahs
 Rory McKay from  Glasgow Hawks
 Stuart Moffat from  Cambridge University
 Calvin Howarth from  Edinburgh.
 Alan Brown from  Dundee HSFP

Out

 Gordon McIlwham to  Bordeaux-Begles
 James McLaren to  Bordeaux-Begles
 Euan Murray released
 Martin Waite released
 Colin Stewart to  Border Reivers
 Jonathan Stuart  to  Border Reivers
 Chris Cusiter to  Watsonians

Competitions

Pre-season and friendlies

Match 1

Glasgow: S Moffat; J Steel, A Bulloch,A Henderson, I McInroy; C Howarth, A Nicol capt; C Blades, B Daly, L Harrison, N Ross, A Hall, R McKay, D Macfadyen, J Petrie. 
Subs used G Bulloch, A Kelly, J White, G Simpson, G Beveridge, T Hayes, R Seib, G Sykes, G Scott, A Wilson

Harlequins: N Williams; R Jewell, U Monye, C Bell, W Greenwood, M Moore; P Burke, M Powell; B Starr, K Wood, L Gomez, K Rudzki, S Miall, D Griffin, L Sherriff, T Diprose. 
Subs used R Jewell, D Slemen, S Bemand, J Leonard, A Tiatia, B Davison, J Evans, K Horstmann

Match 2

Glasgow: Stuart Moffat; Jon Steel, Ian McInroy, Andrew Henderson, Rory Kerr; Tommy Hayes, Graeme Beveridge; David Hilton, Gordon Bulloch, Lee Harrison, Steve Griffiths, Jason White (captain), Jon Petrie, Donnie Macfadyen, Gordon Simpson. Substitutes - Gavin Scott for Gordon Bulloch (21 minutes to 37), Rory McKay for Petrie (21-28), Scott for Gordon Bulloch (half-time-60), Cameron Blades for Hilton (half-time), Andrew Wilson for Macfadyen (half-time), Andrew Hall for Griffiths (half-time), Andrew Kelly for Harrison (51), Calvin Howarth for Henderson (51), Andy Nicol for Beveridge (60), Alan Bulloch for McInroy (60), Nathan Ross for White (69), McKay for Petrie (69), Ben Daly for Gordon Bulloch (71), Kenny Sinclair for Nicol (78).

Exeter Chiefs: D Kelly; C Wall, G Bunny, B Thompson, E Lewsey; T Yapp, R John; A Ozdemir, K Brooking, P Sluman, D Sims, Rob Baxter (capt), G Willis, S Etheridge, Richard Baxter. Subs: N Clarke, D Porte, I Brown, B Cole, J Gaunt, A Murdoch, S Howard.

Match 3

Ulster: B Cunningham; S Stewart; R Constable, J Bell; S Coulter; A Larkin, N Doak; J Fitzpatrick, M Sexton, C Boyd, T McWhirter, J Davidson, A Ward, capt, W Brosnihan, R Nelson.
Replacements: R Kempson for Boyd (48), P Shields for Sexton (40), M Blair for McWhirter (40), R Brink for Brosnihan (40), S Mallon for Coulter (72), S Young for Stewart (25), Brosnihan for Nelson (61), K Campbell for Bell (79).

Glasgow: S Moffat; J Steel; A Bulloch, A Henderson, R Kerr; T Hayes, G Beveridge; C Blades, G Bulloch, L Harrison, A Hall, J White, capt, A Wilson, D Macfadyen, J Petrie. Replacements: D Hilton for Harrison (30), B Daly for Bulloch (70), C Howarth for Moffat (62), A Nicol for Beveridge (40), M Barlett for Kerr (40), G Simpson for Wilson (40), N Ross for Hall (30).

Match 4

Glasgow: Colin Shaw (Glasgow Hawks); Graham Thomson (West of Scotland), Ian McInroy (Glasgow Rugby), Sam Parlane (Stirling County), Rory Kerr (Glasgow Rugby); Barry Irving (Glasgow Rugby), Chris Black (Glasgow Rugby) captain; Euan Murray (Glasgow Hawks), Neil Meikle (Ayr), Andrew Kelly (Glasgow Rugby), Damien Kelly (Ayr), Scott McKechnie (Grangemouth), Rory McKay (Glasgow Rugby), Colin Eadie (Stirling County), Eddie Manawaiti (Ayr).
Replacements (used): Rod Sieb (Aberdeen GSFP), Richard Maxton (Glasgow Hawks), Alastair Davidson (Borders), Gordon Sykes (Ayr), Stephen MacKinnon (Glasgow Hutchesons" Aloysians) (not used): Colin Gregor, Iain Monaghan, Alan Brown

Scottish Exiles: Martin Worthington (Manchester); Sam Cox (Caerphilly), Graeme Kiddie (Plymouth Albion), Paul Baird (Bedford), Alistair Hall (Moseley); Allan Mitchell (Coventry), Ross Blake (Bath); Carl Ambrose (Westcombe Park), Andy Dalgleish (Moseley), Andrew Grierson (Reading), David Whitehead (Castres), John Gunson (Ballynahinch), Chris Capaldi (Plymouth Albion), Lance Hamilton (Wakefield),  David Partington (Dings Crusaders)
Replacements (used): David Michael (Reading), Shane Auld (Tynedale), Greg McDonald (Moseley), Rob Chrystie (Bath), Jon Summers (Reading) (not used): R Aitchison, C Richardson.

Match 5

Scotland U21: Alistair Warnock (Boroughmuir and Scottish Institute of Sport); Andrew Turnbull (Watsonians), Graeme Morrison (Glasgow Hawks), Tom Philip (Edinburgh Rugby and Scottish Institute of Sport), Colin Shaw (Glasgow Hawks); Philip Godman (Newcastle Falcons and Scottish Institute of Sport), Chris Cusiter (Boroughmuir and Scottish Institute of Sport); Alasdair Dickinson (Dundee HSFP and Scottish Institute of Sport), Fergus Thomson (West of Scotland and Scottish Institute of Sport), John Malakoty (Glasgow Hawks), Alasdair Strokosch (Boroughmuir and Scottish Institute of Sport), Mark Rennie (Newcastle Falcons), Steve Swindall (Glasgow Hawks), Allister Hogg (Edinburgh Rugby and Scottish Institute of Sport) captain, David Callam (Hawick and Scottish Institute of Sport) 
Replacements (all used): James Henry (Leicester Tigers), Kelly Brown (Melrose and Scottish Institute of Sport), Andrew Miller (Gala), Mark McMillan (Stirling County and Scottish Institute of Sport), Jonathan Rimmer (Pontypridd), Iain Berthinussen (Gala).
Glasgow: Rory Kerr; Michael Bartlett, Alan Bulloch, Andrew Henderson, Roland Reid; Barry Irving, Chris Black; Gordon Macfadyen (Glasgow Hawks), Ben Daly, Andrew Kelly, Justin Reid (Glasgow Hutchesons" Aloysians), Nathan Ross, Jon Petrie, Paul Burke (Ayr), Gordon Simpson.
Replacements (all used) : Stephen MacKinnon (Glasgow Hutchesons" Aloysians), Gavin Mories (Glasgow Hawks), Stuart Male (Glasgow Hawks), Cameron Blades, Andrew Wilson, Tommy Hayes, Ian McInroy.

European Champions Cup

Pool 3

Results

Round 1

Round 2

Round 3

Round 4

Round 5

Round 6

Magners Celtic League

Pool B

Results

Round 1

Round 2

Round 3

Round 4

Round 5

Round 6

Round 7

Knock out stages

Quarter-finals

Bank of Scotland Pro Cup

12 matches were played in all in the league; with only 3 teams, each had 8 matches each. This meant only 1 match was played on a given day and each team sat out 4 match days.

League table

Results

Match 1

Match 2

Match 3

Match 5

Match 6

Match 8

Match 9

Match 11

Competitive debuts this season

A player's nationality shown is taken from the nationality at the highest honour for the national side obtained; or if never capped internationally their place of birth. Senior caps take precedence over junior caps or place of birth; junior caps take precedence over place of birth. A player's nationality at debut may be different from the nationality shown. Combination sides like the British and Irish Lions or Pacific Islanders are not national sides, or nationalities.

Players in BOLD font have been capped by their senior international XV side as nationality shown.

Players in Italic font have capped either by their international 7s side; or by the international XV 'A' side as nationality shown.

Players in normal font have not been capped at senior level.

A position in parentheses indicates that the player debuted as a substitute. A player may have made a prior debut for Glasgow Warriors in a non-competitive match, 'A' match or 7s match; these matches are not listed.

Tournaments where competitive debut made:

Crosshatching indicates a jointly hosted match.

Sponsorship

Official Kit Supplier

Cotton Traders

Glasgow Warriors announced a six figure deal with Cotton Traders for their kit this year.

References

2002-03
Glasgow
Glasgow
Glasgow